Battery Wilkes is a historic artillery battery located at West Ashley, Charleston, South Carolina. It was built in 1862, as a part of the western exterior defense line. It is a small earthen redoubt has a 10-foot-high parapet wall and a 15-foot-high powder magazine.

It was listed on the National Register of Historic Places in 1982.

References

Military facilities on the National Register of Historic Places in South Carolina
Military installations established in 1862
Buildings and structures in Charleston County, South Carolina
National Register of Historic Places in Charleston County, South Carolina
1862 establishments in South Carolina
Military units and formations established in 1862
American Civil War on the National Register of Historic Places